Islach is a river in Belarus, a right tributary of Western Berezina.

Length is 102 km, basin area is 1,330 km2.

Rivers of Grodno Region
Rivers of Minsk Region
Rivers of Belarus